The 2006–07 Swiss Challenge League was the fourth season of the Swiss Challenge League, the second tier of the Swiss football league pyramid. It began on 21 July 2006 and ended on 26 May 2007. The champions of this season, Neuchâtel Xamax, earned promotion to the 2007–08 Super League. The bottom tho teams, FC Baulmes and YF Juventus, were relegated to the 1. Liga.

League table

Promotion/relegation playoff

AC Bellinzona stay in the Swiss Challenge League.

Top scorers

External links
 Swiss Challenge League

Swiss Challenge League seasons
Swiss
2006–07 in Swiss football